Humboldt Township is one of twelve townships in Humboldt County, Iowa, USA. As of the 2000 census, its population was 624. Despite its name, the township does not contain the City of Humboldt.

Geography

Cities, towns, villages
 Livermore
 Lu Verne

Adjacent townships
 Sherman Township, Kossuth County (north)
 Lu Verne Township, Kossuth County (northeast)
 Vernon Township (east)
 Lake Township (southeast)
 Grove Township (south)
 Rutland Township (southwest)
 Delana Township (west)
 Riverdale Township, Kossuth County (northwest)

Cemetery
The township contains Mount Calvary Cemetery.

Political districts
 Iowa's 4th congressional district
 State House District 4

References
 United States Census Bureau 2008 TIGER/Line Shapefiles
 United States Board on Geographic Names (GNIS)
 United States National Atlas

External links
 US-Counties.com
 City-Data.com

Populated places established in 1857
Townships in Humboldt County, Iowa
Townships in Iowa
1857 establishments in Iowa